The 2014 NFL draft was the 79th annual meeting of National Football League (NFL) franchises to select newly eligible football players to the league. The draft, officially the "Player Selection Meeting", was held at Radio City Music Hall in New York City on May 8 through May 10, 2014. The draft started on May 8, 2014, at 8 pm EDT. The draft was moved from its traditional time frame in late April due to a scheduling conflict at Radio City Music Hall.

There was early discussion and rumors leading up to the draft on the future of staying at the current location in New York City, where it had been held since . Given the increased interest the draft had garnered over the past decade, there was belief that the event may have outgrown Radio City Music Hall, which had been the venue for the past eight drafts. The possibility of extending the draft to four days was also being discussed throughout the months leading up to the draft. The NFL decided in that summer that the 2015 NFL Draft will take place at the Auditorium Theatre in Chicago, Illinois.

The Houston Texans opened the draft by selecting defensive end Jadeveon Clowney from the University of South Carolina. The last time a defensive player was taken with the first overall selection was in 2006, when the Texans selected Mario Williams. The Texans also closed the draft with the selection of safety Lonnie Ballentine of the University of Memphis as Mr. Irrelevant, which is the title given to the final player selected.

The 2014 NFL draft made history when the St. Louis Rams selected Michael Sam in the seventh round. Sam, who became the first openly gay player to ever be drafted in the NFL, was selected 249th out of 256 picks in the 2014 NFL Draft. After this, Sam's jersey was the second best selling rookie jersey on the NFL's website. Sam came out publicly in the months leading up to the draft.

Early entrants

A record 98 underclassmen announced their intention to forgo their remaining NCAA eligibility and declare themselves available to be selected in the draft. When including four players who received degrees but still had eligibility remaining, the number swells to 102. Fourteen underclassmen—plus Teddy Bridgewater who graduated with eligibility remaining—were selected in the draft's first round, including the first four and six of the first ten players selected.

Overview
The following is the breakdown of the 256 players selected by position:

Determination of draft order

The draft order is based generally on each team's record from the previous season, with teams which qualified for the postseason selecting after those which failed to make the playoffs. The Houston Texans with a 2–14 record in 2013 held the first selection of each round. The Dallas Cowboys and Baltimore Ravens finished  with identical 8–8 records and strength of schedule ratings, hence a coin flip was used to determine the selection order — the Cowboys won the flip and thus selected ahead of the Ravens.

Player selections

Notable undrafted players

Trades
In the explanations below, (D) denotes trades that took place during the 2014 draft, while (PD) indicates trades completed pre-draft.

Round one

Round two

Round three

Round four

Round five

Round six

Round seven

Supplemental draft
The supplemental draft was held on July 10, 2014. For each player selected in the supplemental draft, the team forfeits its pick in that round in the draft of the following season. Four players were eligible, but for the second straight year no players were selected.

Summary
The Southeastern Conference (SEC) led all college athletic conferences in terms of first round selections with eleven, including the first two picks of the draft. For the first time since the league's second draft in 1937, no player from the University of Texas was selected.

For the second year in succession — and only the second time since 1967 — no running back was selected in the first round. The first player taken at the position was Bishop Sankey who was selected in the second round with the 54th pick overall. This is the latest point in the history of the draft for the first running back to be selected.

Selections by college athletic conference

Schools with multiple draft selections

Selections by position

U.S. television coverage
The draft was broadcast live by the NFL Network and ESPN. This marks the 35th year of draft coverage on ESPN while the NFL Network had covered the draft since its inception ten years ago.

The two networks' combined first-round coverage drew a record 32 million viewers according to Nielsen ratings which was a 28 percent increase over the previous year. In total 45.7 million viewers watched some part of the three-day event, topping the previous record of 45.4 millions set in 2010.

In popular culture
 The events of the 2014 film Draft Day, take place during the fictionalized 2014 NFL Draft.
 The 2014 NFL draft was also featured in ‘’The League’’.

References
Notes

General references

Trade references

External links
Official Site
2014 NFL Draft at ESPN

National Football League Draft
NFL Draft
Draft
NFL Draft
2010s in Manhattan
American football in New York City
Radio City Music Hall
Sporting events in New York City
Sports in Manhattan